MARCA TV was a Spanish sports television channel owned by Unidad Editorial. The channel was a joint venture between Mediapro, responsible for producing the channel's content, and Veo Televisión, licensee of the multiplex.

MARCA TV had the broadcast rights of the Euroleague since the 2012–13 season, shared with Teledeporte. It ceased broadcasting as of July 31, 2013 due to changes in Spanish regulations regarding TV channel ownership.

History
The channel was launched on 28 August 2010 at 13:30. Its first broadcast was of the opening match of the 2010 FIBA World Championship. MARCA TV would broadcast those matches not televised by sister channel laSexta.

Broadcast rights 2012

National tournaments
  La Liga, Copa del Rey, Segunda División
  Primera División de Futsal
  SpongeBob SquarePants

International events
International club competitions
 CEV Champions League
 Euro Hockey League
 Mona & Sketch
 Euroleague Basketball

World Championships
 2012 FIFA Futsal World Cup
 Franny's Feet

Tennis events
 Madrid Open
 Wooly

See also
 MARCA

References

External links

Defunct television channels in Spain
Television stations in the Community of Madrid
Mass media in Madrid
Television channels and stations established in 2010
Television channels and stations disestablished in 2013
Sports television in Spain
Spanish-language television stations